Peter Holmes (1731–1802) of Peterfield was an Irish High Sheriff and MP in the Parliament of Ireland.

He was the son of Robert Holmes of Peterfield, County Tipperary.

Peter was High Sheriff of Tipperary for 1772 and served as Member of Parliament for Banagher from 1761 to 1790. He was also MP for Kilmallock from 1790 to 1797 and for Doneraile from 1798 to 1800.

He died in 1802. He had married Elizabeth, the daughter of Henry Prittie of Kilboy, County Tipperary; they had no children.

References

 

1731 births
1802 deaths
Irish MPs 1761–1768
Irish MPs 1769–1776
Irish MPs 1776–1783
Irish MPs 1783–1790
Irish MPs 1790–1797
Irish MPs 1798–1800
Members of the Parliament of Ireland (pre-1801) for King's County constituencies
High Sheriffs of Tipperary
Members of the Parliament of Ireland (pre-1801) for County Limerick constituencies
Members of the Parliament of Ireland (pre-1801) for County Cork constituencies